ULCC may refer to:

Union League Club of Chicago, a social and civic club
Ultra Large Crude Carrier, a class of oil tanker
University of London Computer Centre, a supercomputer facility
Ultra low-cost carrier, an airline that is operated with an especially high emphasis on minimizing operating costs

See also
 Uralungal Labour Contract Co-operative Society (ULCCS)